Fotbal Club CFR 1907 II Cluj, commonly known as CFR II Cluj (is the reserve squad of Romanian first league side CFR Cluj.

History

The team was founded in 2007, but dissolved after only two years in 2009. The team played for one season in Liga III in the 2008–2009 season. It was refounded in the summer of 2011 and played in Liga III and Liga IV, but for a short period, the team being dissolved again in 2013.

In the summer of 2017, the team was refounded and enrolled in Liga III.

Honours
Liga IV – Cluj County
Winners (1): 2007–08
Runners-up (1): 2012–13

Players

Second team squad

Out on loan

Club Officials

Board of directors

 Last updated: 6 September 2021
 Source:

Current technical staff

 Last updated: 6 September 2022
 Source:

League history

Notes

References

External links
Official website

CFR Cluj
Sport in Cluj-Napoca
Football clubs in Cluj County
Association football clubs established in 2007
Liga III clubs
Liga IV clubs
2007 establishments in Romania
Railway association football clubs in Romania